Segilola Ogidan is a Nigerian actress, writer, director, and filmmaker. She is a graduate of Media Arts from Royal Holloway University of London, she also has a Masters degree from University of Bristol where she majored in cinema studies. She is popularly known for playing "Ajike" in Netflix original film, A Naija Christmas.

Ogidan started acting professionally after her studies in school when she landed a role in Peter Pan at The Kings Head Theater, a film directed by Stephanie Sinclaire. Segilola appeared in RED TV's series, The Men's Club where she played the character "Tonye". Ogidan has also appeared in some other movies including the Netflix film released in 2022, [[Glamour Girls (2022 film)|Glamour Girls']], Fault Lines, Payday, and Mona.

 Filmography Glamour GirlsFault Lines (TV movies)A Naija ChristmasThe Olive (TV Series)The Men's Club (Nigerian web series)PaydayMonaHot Pepper (TV series)Unspoken''
Tainted Canvas

Nomination and recognition  
In 2022, Segilola was nominated for the NET honor award in the category breakout actress of the year, she was nominated for her performance as the star actor in the film, A Naija Christmas.

References

External links

Living people
Year of birth missing (living people)
Nigerian television actresses
Nigerian film actresses